The Muara Port, also known as Muara Harbour, is a seaport operated by the Muara Port Company (MPC) Sdn Bhd, under the supervision of the Maritime and Port Authority of Brunei Darussalam. The port also contributed to the Brunei Darussalam–Indonesia–Malaysia–Philippines East ASEAN Growth Area (BIMP-EAGA).

Geography 
The port's strategic location allows access to the Oceania, Indian Ocean, Pacific Ocean and Atlantic Ocean. The port lies 28 km from the capital of Brunei, Bandar Seri Begawan and it was considered to be the Gateway for Trade. The Muara Naval Base lies north-east of the port, and Muara Besar Island in the west. The port also contains a free trade zone, which is known as the Muara Export Zone (MEZ).

History 
In 1973, the port was officially completed and it became the largest port in Brunei. In 1982, the port underwent a B$26.5 million expansion project. It can also be noted after 1997, the port might not have been in use due to the decline in cargo volume. The Port Authority bought two quay cranes in 1996.

In 2000, a joint venture was made with the Port of Singapore Authority (PSA), and later on June 23, 2003, United States Navy warships USS Vincennes (CG-49) and USS Harpers Ferry (LSD-49) were berthed at the port during Cooperation Afloat Readiness and Training (CARAT). Once again during CARAT 2005, USS Safeguard (T-ARS-50), USS Rodney M. Davis (FFG-60) and USS Paul Hamilton (DDG-60) were present at Muara Port.

In 2011, there has been regional competition between Bintulu Port and Muara Port. In 2013, three inland container depots have been upgraded, and in 2014, the Belt and Road Initiative's Brunei-Guangxi Economic Corridor (BGEC) was signed between Brunei and China. The Muara Port Company is a joint ventured company between Darussalam Assets Sdn Bhd and Beibu Gulf Holding formed on February 15, 2017, and later on July 18, 2018, the Muara Container Terminal was acquired by the company. On March 26, 2019, Royal Navy frigate HMS Montrose (F236) arrived at the port to conduct exercises, and later from September 27 until 30, the People's Liberation Army Navy training ship Qi Jiguang was berthed at the port during a goodwill visit.

The MPC signed an agreement with the Brunei government to build and acquire the largest fishing complex in Brunei on December 22, 2020, thus enhancing the Brunei–China relations. On June 5, 2021, the pre-commencement ceremony of the Muara Port Expansion Project was attended by the Chinese Ambassador Yu Hong, Minister of Finance and Economy and Minister of Transport and InfoCommunications. On January 30, 2021, the French Navy frigate Vendémiaire (F 734) made a three-day visit to Brunei, and later on July 27, HMS Defender (D36) became the first Royal Navy ship to visit Brunei since 2019.

Plans were made to expand the port by 2023, in which it will increase the quay length and capacity from 280,000 TEUs to 500,000.

Facilities 
There are several designated areas and facilities within the port:

 A  container yard
  of transit warehouses
 A  container freight station
  of warehouses
  of Muara inland container depot
  of Muara export zone

References

External links

Marinetraffic

1974 establishments in Brunei
Brunei-Muara District
Ports and harbours in Southeast Asia